Tochukwu Ojogwu popularly known as Odumodublvck is a Nigerian rapper, and songwriter, known for his stage performance and genre-blend. Odumodublvck is a member of the hip-hop collective Anti World Gangstars. In 2022, he signed a record deal with NATIVE Records, in partnership with Def Jam Recordings. On 23 November 2022, he released his first single under the NATIVE, titled "Picanto" featuring ECko Miles, and Zlatan, which earned him his first chart entry on the Nigeria TurnTable Top 100 at number 79, and reached number 65. On 23 January 2023, he ranked number 4 on TurnTable's NXT Emerging Top Artistes.

Early life
Odumodublvck was born and raised in Lagos State. He had his junior high education at Christ the King College at Gbagada, where he got the stage name “Odumodu” in his second year of his junior high, and relocated with his family to Abuja at the age of 17. He studied Mass Communications at the University of Lagos for his tertiary education, where he graduated with a B.Sc.

Career
In 2022, Odumodublvck released a joint studio album with B.O.C Madaki, titled The Drop, and a few months later he released a follow-up single, "Picanto", featuring ECko Miles, and Zlatan. On 21 November 2022, the single debuted on TurnTable Bubbling Under Top 100 at number 8, and number 15 on Nigeria Hip-Hop/Rap Songs chart. On 28 November 2022, "Picanto" debuted at number 79  on the Top 100, and number 44 on Nigeria Radio, the song also reached Number 6 at Nigeria Hip-Hop/Rap Songs chart.

On 26 March 2022, Odumodublvck performed at the Jameson Connects concert alongside DRB LasGidi, and Vict0ny at Abuja. On 8 December 2022, he won the Next Rated Artist category at Galaxy Music Awards. The rapper gets a new Lexus IS 350, as part of the prize that comes with the Next Rated award. On 9 December 2022, he was announced on the line up of Vertical Rave concert opening acts alongside Teezee, Cruel Santino, PsychoYP, Odunsi The Engine, among others, to be held on 17 December 2022.

Artistry
Odumodublvck is known for fusing Afrobeat, with Drill and Grime music. According to Dazed, "His unrelenting style of drill employs high-life inspired melodies and Nigerian Pidgin English to tell vivid stories about his community and everyday experiences – his narrative style is so specific to Nigerians, it’s hard to pick up on the nuances as an outsider."

Discography

Singles

Accolades

References

Living people
Nigerian rappers
Residents of Lagos
Nigerian hip hop musicians
Year of birth missing (living people)